Mary Ruth Polak (born 1967 or 1968) is a Canadian politician, who served as a Member of the Legislative Assembly of British Columbia (MLA) for the riding of Langley from 2005 to 2020. She was re-elected to the Legislative Assembly of British Columbia in 2017, having represented the constituents of Langley since 2005 and was appointed Minister of Health on June 12, 2017 by Premier Christy Clark. Prior to her new cabinet post, she served as the Minister of the Environment, Minister of Transportation and Infrastructure, Minister of Aboriginal Relations and Reconciliation, Minister of Children and Family Development and Minister Responsible for Child Care, Minister of Healthy Living and Sport, and Parliamentary Secretary to the Minister of Health for the Conversation on Health. Before being elected to the legislative assembly, Polak served as a trustee and former chair of the Surrey School Board in Surrey, British Columbia. She currently resides in Langley, British Columbia.

Surrey School trustee

Same-sex-parents book controversy
Polak was recruited to run as a member of the Surrey Electors Team by school trustee Heather Stilwell. As a Trustee on the Surrey School Board, she voted down a request, along with the majority of the school board, to add three specific books dealing with same sex families as recommended learning resources for the kindergarten and grade one curriculum. These books were requested by a kindergarten teacher to reflect the realities of today's families and to teach his pupils about diversity and tolerance. The Government of British Columbia also declined to approve the same books.

A legal battle to overturn the decision to ban the three books went all the way to the Supreme Court of Canada, where the school board's decision was returned to the board. The judgment cited the need for families headed by same-sex couples to be respected. Chief Justice Beverly McLachlin dismissed the school board's argument that children would be confused or misled by classroom information about same-sex parents. The Surrey School Board then approved a different set of books depicting same sex families. In doing so, Surrey became the first school district in British Columbia to approve books depicting same sex families as recommended learning resources for primary grades, including kindergarten.

Results publishing
As school board chair, Polak made Surrey the first school district in British Columbia to publish school-by-school results for both elementary and secondary schools. These results were based on controversial standardized tests, opposed by a majority of public school teachers. They were published in Vancouver newspapers as "rankings" by the Fraser Institute. Polak also served as chair of the Council of British Columbia School Districts and on the board of directors of the British Columbia School Trustees Association.

Provincial politics
She tried unsuccessfully to gain a seat in the Legislative Assembly as a candidate for the BC Liberal Party, but lost the 2004 Surrey-Panorama Ridge by-election to Jagrup Brar, the New Democratic Party of British Columbia candidate. This was a substantial defeat for the governing Liberals.

Polak won a seat in the 2005 provincial election in the riding of Langley by over 52%, 18 points ahead of her next closest competitor. As an MLA for Langley she served as the Parliamentary Secretary to the Minister of Health for the Conversation on Health and later as the Minister of Healthy Living and Sport.

Polak ran successfully again in the 2009 Provincial election, earning more than 56% at the polls and increased her margin over her nearest opponent to more than 20 points.

In the 2013 British Columbia general election, Mary Polak sought reelection in Langley for a third term. She won her riding easily with nearly 52% of the popular vote nearly doubling the vote total of Andrew Mercier, the NDP candidate. She also defeated John Cummins, the leader of the British Columbia Conservative Party who received less than 12% of the popular vote. A week before Election Day, Polak's campaign manager, Todd Hauptman, resigned, citing homophobia among the Langley electorate as his reason for stepping down. Polak suggested that Hauptman had not fully disclosed his reasons for resigning. She said that Hauptman quit after being alleged to have leaked information about the Liberal Party's strategy to the New Democratic Party (NDP); Polak said that the New Democratic Party candidate was a friend of Hauptman's. Hauptman, a gay man, issued a press release about his resignation. Xtra!, a magazine that publishes lesbian and gay Canadian news, requested an interview with Hauptman to which he originally assented and later declined.

Electoral record

References

External links
Mary Polak, MLA for Langley
Mary Polak, Legislative Assembly of British Columbia
Minister's bio in BC Newsroom
British Columbia Ministry of Environment
@MaryforBC on Twitter

British Columbia Liberal Party MLAs
British Columbia school board members
Women government ministers of Canada
Health ministers of British Columbia
Living people
Members of the Executive Council of British Columbia
People from Langley, British Columbia (city)
Women MLAs in British Columbia
Year of birth missing (living people)
21st-century Canadian politicians
21st-century Canadian women politicians